is a Japanese voice actress and singer. One of her most notable roles was Chocolat in Noucome.

Filmography

Anime
Upotte!! – Sig
Noucome – Chocolat
Amagi Brilliant Park –  Chiba
Date A Live – Tamae Okamine
R-15 – Kiya Star
Mondaiji-tachi ga Isekai kara Kuru Sou Desu yo? – Sandra Dortlake
Isuca – Tamako
Nichijou – Haruna Annaka
Sakura Trick – Ikeno Sister,Yukako Mochida
Hitsugi no Chaika – Julia

Video games
Suzumiya Haruhi No Tsuisou
Atelier Ayesha: The Alchemist of Dusk
Idol Jihen
Crusaders Quest – Kronos
Date A Live Twin Edition Rio Reencarnation – Tamae Okamine
MapleStory - Nero, announcer

References

1988 births
Living people
Anime singers
Japanese women singers
Japanese video game actresses
Japanese voice actresses
Voice actresses from Toyama Prefecture
People from Uozu, Toyama